Bowlees Creek is a 4.8 mile stream. This river is located within watershed(s): Sarasota Bay Watershed.  Manatee County, Florida, USA.

References 

Geography of Florida